Priscilla Lee Presson (born 1980) is an American actress, musician, director, writer, and producer best known for her roles in underground B horror and comedy films. Presson has collaborated with the film collective of Gonzoriffic based in the Atlanta Georgia area in many films, as well as co-created Niha pictures with fellow Gonzoriffic alumni Kert Rats.

Early years
Presson spent most of her youth active in theater, acting in many plays and competed in regional and state competitions in the State of Georgia both for acting and singing. She was awarded the prestigious National School Choral Award in 1997 and 1998 and was invited to perform with other award-winning junior level singers at the University of Georgia during her high school years. She was a member of the Classic City Singers (2002-2004), a collective of classically trained singers which performed free shows throughout the greater Atlanta area. Presson became involved in the alternative rock scene in her late teens and was in the band Scratch for over a decade (1998-2009)

Acting
Presson was a theater actress beginning at the age of 15, playing roles in A Midsummer Night's Dream, the 1940's Radio Hour, You Can't Take It with You, Harvey (play), Come Back to the Five and Dime, Jimmy Dean, Jimmy Dean (play), and Oliver!.
Through Priscilla's musical background she and film director Andrew N. Shearer (co-founder of Gonzoriffic film collective) were first made aware of one another. Through this meeting her cult film career began with a small role in the film Fake Blood, and other roles began to be written for her to play. She is a character and method actor which has led her to becoming a seasoned comedian.

Presson has said that her goal as an actress is to spread a positive message to plus sized women, stating "women of all shapes and sizes are beautiful and sexy, regardless of what conventional standards tell them." Presson aspires to be a positive role model for girls and women of all shapes and sizes.

After becoming established as a standard player in the Gonzoriffic Collective, Presson set out with fellow Gonzoriffic alumni and childhood friend Kert Rats creating Niha Pictures. Presson and Rats co-write, produce, film, and direct all their no-budget films. Together they have written, filmed, and produced films including Legend of the Sineater, Tooth Fairy Assassin, and The Univited. Priscilla is fiercely loyal and protective of her art, which has had its consequences over the years at one point costing her her career in law enforcement. However Presson has no regrets, stating "My art is my life, so if they don't get it, screw 'em"

Presson continues to act, write, and film while living a relatively quiet lifestyle. She still occasionally records music with one of the other founding members of Scratch as well as other local musicians, and will perform publicly from time to time to raise money and awareness for causes she believes in. (Such as AIDS Athens, Human Rights, the LBGTQ community's rights and awareness, Women's' Rights and awareness, Ending Childhood violence, etc...) Otherwise she can be found singing at her favorite karaoke joints enjoying her anonymity in the crowd. If you catch her in the right mood, with a whiskey sour in hand, she may quote that all too famous line for you, if you ask her nicely. If you're really a hardcore fan, you know the one.

Filmography
Fake Blood (2007)

Blood Witch (2008)

I'm in the Basement (2008)

Go Gonzoriffic Commercial (2008)

Erotic Couch (2009)

Foxholes (2009)

Nude Witchcraft (2010)

Dr. Humpinstein's Erotik Castle (2011)

One Nine Hundred (2011)

Tooth Fairy Assassin, The last Tooth (2011)

The Uninvited (2012)

The Rang (2012)

Pajama Nightmare (2012)

Bikini Gorilla (2013)

Leonardo Davinci Vs. The World (2014)

Yr cheating heart (2016)

Smile Pretty Judy (2018)

References

External links
 Retrieved January 10, 2013; Andrew Shearer (2012) http://www.gonzoriffic.com
 Retrieved January 10, 2013; "Internet Movie Database" 
 Retrieved January 10, 2012; http://www.nihapictures.com

1980 births
21st-century American actresses
Actresses from Georgia (U.S. state)
American film actresses
American film producers
American screenwriters
American stage actresses
Living people
American women film producers
21st-century American women musicians